Alex Willoughby (17 September 1944 – 14 July 2004) was a Scottish professional football forward who played for Rangers and Aberdeen.

Career
Willoughby was born in Springburn, Glasgow, and educated at Petershill Primary School and Colston Junior Secondary School, both located in the Springburn area. He played youth football with his local Boys' Brigade team, and then with Drumchapel Amateurs before commencing his career with Rangers as a schoolboy signing at 15 years of age in 1959. He subsequently signed professional terms with Rangers in 1961. He scored in the 1963 Scottish League Cup Final win over Morton, but was omitted from the 1967 European Cup Winners' Cup Final team to the surprise of many, with Roger Hynd preferred, despite Willoughby having scored 17 goals in 14 games in the three months prior.

He joined Aberdeen in 1969, and left Scotland in 1974 to play for Hong Kong Rangers, before spells in Australia and South Africa. He then coached Icelandic side KA.

Personal life
His cousin was former Rangers and Aberdeen forward Jim Forrest. Willoughby played alongside Forrest at Drumchapel, Rangers, Aberdeen and Hong Kong Rangers. He died in 2004 from cancer, aged 59.

References

1944 births
2004 deaths
Scottish footballers
Scottish football managers
Footballers from Glasgow
Association football forwards
Aberdeen F.C. players
Rangers F.C. players
Scottish Football League players
Drumchapel Amateur F.C. players
Hong Kong Rangers FC players
Expatriate footballers in Hong Kong
Scottish expatriate footballers
Scottish expatriate football managers
Scottish expatriate sportspeople in Hong Kong
Scottish expatriate sportspeople in Australia
Expatriate soccer players in South Africa
Knattspyrnufélag Akureyrar managers
People from Springburn